Giovanni Vacca can refer to:

Giovanni Vacca (mathematician)
Giovanni Vacca (physiologist)
Giovanni Vacca (naval officer)